Cricket Association of Bengal (CAB) is the governing body for cricket in the Indian state of West Bengal. Its headquarters are located in the Eden Gardens stadium, Kolkata. It is a full member of Board of Control for Cricket in India.

It governs and manage Bengal cricket team and conduct various tournaments in the state. Its team represents West Bengal state in Indian domestic cricket. Its team plays their home matches at Eden Gardens cricket stadium, Kolkata.

Tournaments 

The Cricket Association of Bengal organises various league tournaments, for the age group Under-13, Under-16, and Under-19 and Under-21 categories. It also conducts National and international Tournaments.

Some of the tournaments are:
CAB One Day League
CAB Two Day League
CAB First Division League
CAB Superleague
CAB Senior Knockout
P. Sen Trophy
A.N. Ghosh Memorial Trophy
J.C. Mukherjee Trophy
CAB Under Thirteen
CAB Under Fifteen
CAB Under Eighteen

President 

CAB president is head of its administration, who leads its meetings. Former Bengal and India cricketer Sourav Ganguly served as its president from 2015 to 2019. Avishek Dalmiya, the son of former BCCI president Jagmohan Dalmiya was president from 2020 to 2022. Snehasish Ganguly, the brother of Sourav Ganguly has been its president since October 2022.

West Bengal State T20 Cricket Federation 
There are 18 District Associations which have been covered under WBSTCA, which also has 174 clubs/villages affiliated with the same.
District Units:
Kolkata District Twenty 20 Cricket Association
Bankura District Twenty 20 Cricket Association
Birbhum District Twenty 20 Cricket Association
Burdhaman District Twenty 20 Cricket Association
Coochbehar District Twenty 20 Cricket Association
Darjeeling District Twenty 20 Cricket Association
Hoogly District Twenty 20 Cricket Association
Howrah District Twenty 20 Cricket Association
Jalpaiguri District Twenty 20 Cricket Association
Malda District Twenty 20 Cricket Association
Midnapur District Twenty 20 Cricket Association
Murshidabad District Twenty 20 Cricket Association
Nadia District Twenty 20 Cricket Association
Purulia District Twenty 20 Cricket Association
North 24 Parganas District Twenty 20 Cricket Association
South 24 Parganas District Twenty 20 Cricket Association
South Dinajpur District Twenty 20 Cricket Association
North Dinajpur District Twenty 20 Cricket Association

References

External links
 Info at ESPN Cricinfo
 cabdistrict.com 
 

Cricket administration in India
Cricket in West Bengal
Bengal
Sports organizations established in 1928
Organisations based in Kolkata
1928 establishments in India